Chim-Nir Aviation was an airline based in Herzliya Airport, Israel.  It was Israel’s leading Aircraft operator of specialized flying services and the private helicopter services.

Fleet

The Chim-Nir Aviation fleet consisted of the following aircraft (as of May 2007):

 1 Bell 206 (1+4)
 1 Bell 206 L (1+6)
 1 Bell 407 (1+6)
 2 Twin-Star AS 355 F2 (1+5)
 1 MBB BO-105 (1+4)
 2 El Tomcat Mk.V (Version of Bell 47) for aerial application
 1 Cessna Citation S 550 Jet
 1 Piper Cheyenne III PA-42
 1 Beechcraft King Air C-90
 2 Piper PA-18
 2 Piper Pawnee PA-36
 2 Piper Cherokee PA-32
 8 Ayres Turbo Thrush S-2R 34

References

External links
Chim-Nir Aviation

Defunct airlines of Israel
Airlines established in 1991
Airlines disestablished in 2019
Companies disestablished in 2019